Nisim Vergara (born 1 August 1998) is an Argentine professional footballer who plays as a midfielder.

Career
Vergara began his career with Deportivo Morón. He was moved into their first-team squad during the 2017–18 Primera B Nacional campaign, though failed to make an appearance but was on the substitutes bench for fixtures with All Boys, Sarmiento, Villa Dálmine and Gimnasia y Esgrima (J). Vergara's professional debut arrived in the following season, with the midfielder appearing for the final five minutes of a scoreless draw versus Gimnasia y Esgrima (M) on 24 September 2018.

Career statistics
.

References

External links

1998 births
Living people
Place of birth missing (living people)
Argentine footballers
Association football midfielders
Primera Nacional players
Deportivo Morón footballers
Club y Biblioteca Ramón Santamarina footballers
Club Atlético Fénix players